Kataripalya is a place in Kolar city, Karnataka state of India. The name roughly translates to sword town in Kannada. Kataripalya is home to a historic temple of Gangamma.

External links
Kataripalya

Villages in Kolar district